Chicago, Illinois, is the third-most populous city in the United States.

Chicago may also refer to:

Places

United States
 New Chicago, California, an unincorporated community formerly known as "Chicago" in Amador County
 Port Chicago, California, a former town and naval station in Contra Costa County
 Chicago River, a river in Chicago, Illinois
 Lake Chicago, a prehistoric lake from the Wisconsin Glacial Period
 Chicago, Kansas, a formerly populated community

Zimbabwe
 Chicago, Zimbabwe, a suburb of Kwekwe

Culture and the arts

Music
 Chicago (band), a jazz rock band founded in 1967
 Chicago (album), 1970
 "Chicago" (Graham Nash song), 1970
 "Chicago" (Michael Jackson song), also known as She Was Lovin' Me
 "Chicago song", a song on David Sanborn's A Change of Heart, 1987
 "Chicago" (Sufjan Stevens song), 2005
 "Chicago" (That Toddlin' Town), a 1922 song by Fred Fisher
 Chicago house, a genre of electronic dance music
 "Chicago", a 1977 single by Kiki Dee
 "Chicago", a song by Groove Armada from the 1999 album Vertigo
 "Chicago", a song by Hieroglyphics from the 2003 album Full Circle
 "Chicago", a song by Kate Voegele from the 2007 album Don't Look Away
 "Chicago", a song by The Devil Wears Prada from the 2011 album Dead Throne
 "Chicago", a song by Tom Waits from the 2011 album Bad as Me

Theatre, film and television 
 Chicago (play), 1926, written by Maurine Dallas Watkins
 Chicago (1927 film), based on the 1926 play
 Chicago (musical), first performed in 1975, based on the 1926 play
 Chicago (2002 film), based on the 1975 musical
 "Chicago" (Prison Break), a 2007 TV episode
 Chicago, a 1965 play by Sam Shepard
 Chicago (franchise), a group of NBC television dramas set in the Illinois city

Literature
 Chicago (magazine), a lifestyle periodical about the Illinois city
 Chicago (manga), by Yumi Tamura
 Chicago (novel), by Egyptian author Alaa-Al-Aswany
 "Chicago" (poem), by Carl Sandburg
 The Chicago Manual of Style, for American English

Games
 Chicago (bridge card game), a form of contract bridge
 Chicago (poker card game), a Swedish poker game (or any one of several stud poker variants, including "Chicago", "Big Chicago", and "Little Chicago")
 Chicago (pool), a "money ball" pool gambling game
 Chicago 90, a 1989 video game by Microïds

People
 Judy Chicago (born 1939), American feminist artist

Science and technology
 334 Chicago, a large main-belt asteroid found in 1892
 Chicago (typeface), a classic Apple Macintosh font
 Chicago Convention on International Civil Aviation, a 1944 agreement
 Chicago Pile-1, the world's first nuclear reactor
 Windows Chicago, the code name for Windows 95

Schools of thought
Any of several disciplines, some associated with the University of Chicago, including
 Chicago school (architecture)
 Chicago school (literary criticism)
 Chicago school (sociology)
 Chicago school of economics

Sports

Current teams
Chicago Bears, a professional American football team of the NFL's National Football Conference, Northern Division
Chicago Blackhawks, a professional ice hockey team of the NHL's Western Conference, Central Division
Chicago Sky, a professional basketball team of the WNBA's Eastern Conference
Chicago Bulls, a professional basketball team of the NBA's Eastern Conference, Central Division
Chicago Cubs, a professional baseball team of the MLB's National League, Central Division
Chicago Red Stars, a professional soccer team in the National Women's Soccer League, based in the suburb of Bridgeview
Chicago Fire Soccer Club, a professional soccer team in the MLS' Eastern Conference based in the suburb of Bridgeview
Chicago White Sox, a professional baseball team of MLB's American League, Central Division
Chicago Wolves, a professional ice hockey team of the American Hockey League's Western Conference, Central Division and affiliate of the NHL's St. Louis Blues
Club Atlético Nueva Chicago, an association football (soccer) club of Argentina's Primera División (premier division) in Mataderos, Buenos Aires

Former teams
Chicago Blitz, a professional American football team of the United States Football League (1982–84)
Chicago Boosters, an Independent American football team which played in one APFA game (1920–1921)
Chicago Bruisers, a professional arena football team and charter member of the Arena Football League (1987–89)
Chicago Bulls (AFL, 1926), a professional American football team
Chicago Cardinals (NFL, 1920-1959), a professional American football team
 Chicago Cardinals (ice hockey), a professional team in the American Hockey Association (1926–1927)
 Chicago Indians, an American football team of the former minor American Football League (1938–39)
 Chicago Packers/Zephyrs, a professional basketball team of the National Basketball Association (1961–1963), now the Washington Wizards
Chicago Rockets ("Chicago Hornets" in 1949), a professional American football team of the All-America Football Conference (1946–49)
 Chicago Rush, a professional arena football team of the Arena Football League (2001–2013)
Chicago Shamrocks, a professional ice hockey team in the American Hockey Association (1930–1932)
 Chicago Stags, a professional basketball team of the National Basketball Association (1946–1950)
Chicago Sting, an American professional NASL soccer team (1974–1988)

Transportation
 USS Chicago, any of several U.S. Navy vessels
 Chicago (aircraft), a plane used in the first successful air circumnavigation of the globe
 Chicago (CTA), Chicago Transit Authority
 Chicago station (CTA Blue Line), or Chicago and Milwaukee
 Chicago station (CTA Brown and Purple Lines), or Chicago and Franklin
 Chicago station (CTA Red Line), or Chicago and State
 City of Chicago (train), a passenger train
 Chicago Tunnel Company, a former narrow-gauge freight network under downtown Chicago

See also
 Chicago Park, California, an unincorporated community in Nevada County
 Chicago Heights, Illinois, Cook County
 Chicago Ridge, Illinois, Cook County
 North Chicago, Illinois, Lake County
 South Chicago Heights, Illinois, Cook County
 West Chicago, Illinois, DuPage County
 East Chicago, Indiana, a city
 New Chicago, Indiana, a town
 Chicago Junction, Ohio, former name of Willard, Ohio
 Little Chicago, Minnesota, an unincorporated community
 Chicago Corners, Wisconsin, an unincorporated community
 Chicago Junction, Wisconsin, an unincorporated community
 Little Chicago, Wisconsin, an unincorporated community
 "My Kind of Town", a song sometimes mistakenly referred to as "Chicago"
 Chicago shooting (disambiguation)
 Chicagoland (disambiguation)